John van Batenburg Stafford (born 7 December 1967) is a Caymanian sailor. He competed in the Laser event at the 1996 Summer Olympics.

References

External links
 

1967 births
Living people
Caymanian male sailors (sport)
Olympic sailors of the Cayman Islands
Sailors at the 1996 Summer Olympics – Laser
Place of birth missing (living people)